Nicole Wong Siaw Ting (born ) is a Malaysian politician from BN (MCA). She is a member of the Dewan Negara. She is the first female MCA Youth Chief in the history of 63 years. MCA Youth was established in 1955, it is a wing of MCA that includes 100% men until it opened its membership to women in 2013.

Nicole Wong contested in Seputeh during the 13th Malaysia General Election, but was defeated by Teresa Kok, incumbent member of parliament of Seputeh from Democratic Action Party (DAP).

Election results

Honours
 :
 Companion Class II of the Exalted Order of Malacca (DPSM) – Datuk (2020)

See also 
 Members of the Dewan Negara, 14th Malaysian Parliament
 Women in the Dewan Negara

References 

Women members of the Dewan Negara
Malaysian Chinese Association politicians
Living people
1980 births
21st-century Malaysian women politicians